NagaCorp Ltd. (Chinese: 金界控股有限公司) is a Hong Kong-listed hotel, gaming and leisure company. Its Cambodian property, NagaWorld, is the country's largest hotel and gaming resort, and is Phnom Penh's only integrated hotel-casino entertainment complex. NagaCorp holds a 70-year casino licence in Cambodia which runs until 2065, and has a monopoly within a  radius of Phnom Penh (except the Cambodia-Vietnam border area, Bokor, Kirirom Mountains, and Sihanoukville) until 2045.

The Naga casino first opened on May 1, 1995 on a boat moored in the Mekong River in Phnom Penh. The casino moved to its current land-based facility in 2003. NagaCorp held its initial public offering on the Hong Kong Stock Exchange in 2006, making it the first gaming-related company to trade on the exchange, and the first company with operations in Cambodia to become publicly traded. Junket operator SunCity Group have a VIP Club located on Level 23 of Naga2 hotel tower in Phnom Penh.

The company is also developing a casino resort in Vladivostok, Russia.

See also 
 Chen Lip Keong

References

External links
 

Companies of Cambodia
Gambling companies
Companies listed on the Hong Kong Stock Exchange
Gambling companies established in 1995
Cambodian companies established in 1995